New Toy is the first extended play by English-American singer-songwriter Lene Lovich released in 1981 by Stiff Records. It was released outside the United Kingdom in three different versions, one featured six new songs, while the other two contained songs from her previous albums, Stateless (1978) and Flex (1979).

The main single "New Toy", in which she makes fun of the consumer society, was released in February 1981 and became successful in charts, peaking at number 19 on the Billboard Hot Dance Club Songs number 53 on the UK Singles Chart, and number 29 on the Australian Kent Music Report. It was written by Thomas Dolby, about his new Fairlight CMI synthesizer. He created the song specifically for Lovich after seeing her perform live.

The songs "Special Star" and "Savages" later appeared on her third studio album, No Man's Land (1982) and all the songs from the EP appeared on the CD re-issue of the album.

Track listing

Charts

Credits and personnel
Lene Lovich - vocals, songwriter, producer
Les Chappell - songwriter, producer
Mike "The Woj" Wojnicki - Inspiration

References

Lene Lovich albums
1981 debut EPs
Stiff Records EPs